Players and pairs who neither have high enough rankings nor receive wild cards may participate in a qualifying tournament held one week before the annual Wimbledon Tennis Championships.

Seeds

  Guillaume Raoux /  Éric Winogradsky (qualified)
  Luke Jensen /  Richey Reneberg (second round)
  Martin Laurendeau /  Leif Shiras (second round)
  Zeeshan Ali /  Jonathan Canter (qualified)
  Jason Stoltenberg /  Todd Woodbridge (qualifying competition)
  Dan Cassidy /  Jeff Klaparda (second round)
  Ricardo Acuña /  Royce Deppe (first round)
  Brett Custer /  David Macpherson (first round)
  Steve Guy /  Jared Palmer (first round)
  Peter Palandjian /  Larry Scott (first round)

Qualifiers

  Guillaume Raoux /  Éric Winogradsky
  Brian Page /  Scott Warner
  José Daher /  Fernando Roese
  Zeeshan Ali /  Jonathan Canter
  Lan Bale /  Mihnea-Ion Năstase

Qualifying draw

First qualifier

Second qualifier

Third qualifier

Fourth qualifier

Fifth qualifier

External links

1989 Wimbledon Championships – Men's draws and results at the International Tennis Federation

Men's Doubles Qualifying
Wimbledon Championship by year – Men's doubles qualifying